Jirama ( Jiro sy rano malagasy) is a state-owned electric utility and water services company in Madagascar.

History 

The Jirama was established on 17 October 1975 when the Société Malagasy des Eaux et Electricité and the Société des Energies de Madagascar merged. Up until 1999, it was the only state-owned electricity company of the country. After 1999, the Jirama maintained its monopoly on transportation and distribution networks.

In 2007, when Antananrivo's Mayor Andry Rajoelina took office, the city's treasury had a debt of 8.2 billion Malagasy Ariary (approximately 4.6 million U.S. dollars). On 4 January 2008, because of unpaid debts to the Jirama, the city of Antananarivo was hit by a general water cutoff and brownouts of the city's street lights. After an audit, it was found that the Jirama owed about the same amount of money to the city, and the sanction on the city's population was relieved.

In 2008, thanks to the launch of a new thermal power plant in Mandroseza, the Jirama was able to service 2,000 additional consumers in Antananarivo. In June 2009, Désiré Rasidy was named new CEO of the Jirama. In 2012, thanks to the financing of the French Development Agency, the Jirama launched the fuel oil power plant constructed by British Broad Crown that aimed at ending power shortages for good in Mahajanga.

According to an IMF report published in March 2018, the Jirama's financial difficulties are a major burden for the Malagasy economy. In June 2018, the Jirama was considering a rehabilitation of its electricity distribution network.

Activities 

Headquartered in Antananarivo, the Jirama serves 340,000 clients for electricity in 114 localities and 65 water distribution centres. The Jirama is 100% owned by the government of Madagascar.

Plants
18 MW Solar-hybride central at Tanambao Verrerie, Toamasina (since 2021)
 8,4 MW Antelomita Hydroelectric Power Station at Anjeva Gara
91 MW Andekaleka Hydroelectric Power Station
24 MW Mandraka Power Station
205 MW Sahofika Hydroelectric Power Station
List of power stations in Madagascar

References

External links
 

Electric power companies of Madagascar
Public utilities established in 1975
Government-owned companies of Madagascar
Water companies of Madagascar
Companies based in Antananarivo